The 13th National Basketball Association All-Star Game was played on January 16, 1963, at Los Angeles Memorial Sports Arena in Los Angeles. The coaches were Red Auerbach for the East, and Fred Schaus for the West. This was the last All-Star game to feature one of the original All-Stars from the 1951 game, with Bob Cousy making his thirteenth and final All Star appearances.

Eastern Conference

Western Conference

Score by Periods
 

Halftime— East, 56-50
Third Quarter— East, 80-73
Officials: Sid Borgia and Earl Strom
Attendance: 14,838.

External links
 1963 NBA All Star Game Box Score

National Basketball Association All-Star Game
All-Star
Basketball competitions in Los Angeles
NBA All-Star Game
NBA All-Star Game
NBA All-Star Game